Jewel Blanch is an Australian country singer-songwriter. She is the daughter of country music singer, Arthur Blanch, with whom she has performed.

Career
Jewel Blanch was born in 1958 the daughter of Arthur and Berice Blanch. At the age of three, she appeared on the Coca Cola TV Show on Channel 9 in Brisbane singing and playing her own ukulele. In 1962 The Blanch Family were signed to W&G label in Melbourne where they recorded a song written for Jewel "I Wanta Stay on Jumbo" and a duet with her father "On Accounts I Love You". "Jumbo" was an instant success and became a national hit.

In 1963, the Blanch family moved to the United States where she started school, before returning in 1965. At the age of eight, Jewel was contracted to EMI and recorded songs on the HMV Label. In 1969 the family moved back to the USA.

She appeared as terminally-ill singer Abbie Singleton in 'The Young Doctors' in late 1976.

In 1978, Blanch recorded for RCA after Chet Atkins and Bob Ferguson heard her singing "Will I Ever Be Loved". In 1979 she won the USA Billboard Magazine's Country Music Award for Number One New Female Singles Artist. In 1979, the family moved back home to Australia.

At the 1982 CMAA, Jewel and her father Arthur won Album of the Year for The Lady and the Cowboy and Jewel also won Best Female Vocalist with her own composition "I Can Love You". In 1984 Jewel and her husband moved to Nashville to live and opened a management and publishing company called Ten Ten.

Discography

Albums

Singles

Awards

Country Music Awards of Australia
The Country Music Awards of Australia (CMAA) (also known as the Golden Guitar Awards) is an annual awards night held in January during the Tamworth Country Music Festival, celebrating recording excellence in the Australian country music industry. They have been held annually since 1973.

|-
|rowspan="2"| 1982
| "I Can Love You"
| Female Vocalist of the Year
| 
|-
| The Lady and the Cowboy (with Arthur Blanch)
| Album of the Year
| 
|-
| 1983
| Send All the Ghosts Away
| Female Vocalist of the Year
| 
|-

 Note: wins only

References

Living people
Australian women singers
Australian musicians
Australian singer-songwriters
Year of birth missing (living people)